The Poison Arrows are a Chicago, Illinois-based band signed to File Thirteen Records. Band members include Justin Sinkovich (singer/guitarist of Atombombpocketknife), Pat Morris (bassist of Don Caballero) and Adam Reach. Their album, No Known Note, was released in April 2017. In 2022, War Regards was released.

Discography

Albums 
 Poison Arrows (2001, Sound on Sound)
 First Class, and Forever (2009, File Thirteen)
 Newfound Resolutions (August 3, 2010, File Thirteen)
 No Known Note (April 28, 2017)
 War Regards (2022, File Thirteen/Coup Sur Coup)

EPs
 Trailer Park (2004, File Thirteen)
 Premix (2006, digital download)
 Straight into the Drift (2007, File Thirteen)
 Casual Wave (2008, File Thirteen)
 FT90 split with My Way My Love (2018, Coup Sur Coup)

References

External links
 

Musical groups from Chicago
Coup Sur Coup Records artists